San Francesco Saverio alla Garbatella is a 20th-century parochial church and titular church in southern Rome, dedicated to Francis Xavier.

History 

San Francesco Saverio alla Garbatella was built in 1931–33.

Karol Wojtyła, later Pope John Paul II, ministered in the church after the Second World War; it was the first church in Rome that he visited after being elected Pope in 1978. Pope Paul VI also visited in 1976.

On 21 February 2001, it was made a titular church to be held by a cardinal-deacon. 

Cardinal-Protectors
Leo Scheffczyk (2001–2006)
Franc Rodé (2006–present); made a cardinal-priest in 2016, title elevated to a cardinal-priesthood pro hac vice

Structure
On a Latin cross plan, the facade is covered in brick and decorated with travertine pilasters. The main entrance is framed by Doric columns. On the entablature there is a large lunette, inside a circular arch. The tympanum carries the arms of Pope Pius XII.

The dome is of reinforced concrete, decorated with arched windows; it is painted in gray, in imitation of lead Baroque domes. It is surmounted by a simple roof lantern. The interior is divided into three naves, delimited by Ionic columns; the barrel vault is coffered in stucco.

The right transept has a fresco of the Madonna of Divine Love and commemorates the 1943 bombing of San Lorenzo, Rome. The apse holds a canvas painting of Francis Xavier preaching in Goa.

References

External links

Titular churches
Roman Catholic churches completed in 1933
20th-century Roman Catholic church buildings in Italy
Rome Q. X Ostiense
Renaissance Revival architecture in Italy